Alan Stuart Robinson (born November 14, 1926), better known as Jim Robinson, is a politician in the American state of Florida. He served in the Florida House of Representatives from 1966 to 1974, representing the 58th district.

References

1926 births
Living people
Members of the Florida House of Representatives
Cornell University alumni